NK HAŠK is a Croatian football club from Zagreb. They play in the Croatian Third League West, and play their home games at Stadion na Peščenici in Zagreb. In 2006, the club merged with NK Naftaš from Ivanić-Grad.

Honours 

 Treća HNL – Center:
Winners (1): 2003–04

External links
Official Club Website
NK HAŠK at Nogometni magazin 

Football clubs in Croatia
Football clubs in Zagreb
Association football clubs established in 1990
1990 establishments in Croatia

lt:HAŠK Zagreb